Shari'ati Metro Station is a station on Isfahan Metro Line 1. The station opened on 20 July 2017. It is located on intersection in southern central Isfahan along Chaharbagh Avenue just north of the intersection with Shariati and Nikbakht Streets. The next station on the north side is Si-o-se Pol Station and on the south it's followed by Azadi Station.

References

Isfahan Metro stations
Railway stations opened in 2017